La diva may refer to:
 La Diva (group), a Filipino pop girl group
 "La diva", a 2007 song by Celine Dion form the album D'elles